Shelley Community Football Club is an English football club based in Shelley, West Yorkshire. They were most recently members of the North West Counties League Division One North and play at Storthes Hall Park. The club is a FA Charter Standard Club affiliated to the Sheffield & Hallamshire County Football Association.

History

The club was founded in 1903. The club started their first season in the Huddersfield and District League. The second season in the Huddersfield & District league, saw the club pick up their first silverware when they finished as champions of Division 2 Section A, however they lost the play off for promotion to Section B winners Meltham. The club would then have to wait over twenty years for anymore success in the league, when they won the Division two title in 1928–29. Another long wait was required for more silverware, when 31 years later they clinched the Division three title, something they would repeat again in the 1986–87 season. Before their last title win in the Huddersfield and District league the club had folded in 1972, only returning to life for the 1980–81 season.

Up until the end of 2010–11 season the club had stayed in the Huddersfield and District league, but the following season the club joined division two of the West Yorkshire League, going on to win the division at their first attempt and gaining promotion to Division one. The following season the club gained promotion to the Premier division when they finished as runners up. The club would then spend the next few seasons in the Premier division of the West Yorkshire league, until the end of the 2017–18 season, when they then joined Division one North of the North West Counties League. Their first season in the North West Counties league, saw the club also make their debut in the FA Vase, making it to the Second qualifying round, before being knocked out by Cammell Laird 1907.

In 2020, the club resigned from the NWCFL, effectively making their West Yorkshire League side their first team.

Season-by-season record

Ground

Since 2011 the club has played its home games at Stafflex Arena, which is Shared with Huddersfield Town W.F.C. within the Storthes Hall Park which sits in the grounds of the old Storthes Hall Hospital.
The club's original ground was Back Lane in Shelley, moving to Westerley Lane in the 1950s and then Skelmanthorpe Rec in 2000.

Honours 
West Yorkshire Association League
 Division Two Champions (1) 2011–12
Huddersfield and District League
 Division Two Champions (2) 1928–29, 2000–01
 Division Two Section A Champions (1) 1904–05
 Division Three Champions (3) 1960–61, 1986–87, 2010–11
 Division Four Champions (1) 2009–10
 Groom Cup winners (3) 1960–61, 2009–10, 2010–11

References

External links

Football clubs in England
Sports clubs in Huddersfield
Football clubs in West Yorkshire
Sports venues in Huddersfield
North West Counties Football League clubs
West Yorkshire Association Football League
Sheffield & Hallamshire County FA members
1903 establishments in England
Association football clubs established in 1903
Kirkburton